The South Salina Street Historic District is located in Syracuse, New York.  The district encompasses the historic core of what was originally the village of Danforth.  It was added to the National Register of Historic Places in 1986.

Gallery

References

Historic districts in Onondaga County, New York
Historic districts on the National Register of Historic Places in New York (state)
National Register of Historic Places in Syracuse, New York